"Only Love Remains" is the fourth single from Paul McCartney's 1986 album, Press to Play. The song reached number 34 on the UK Singles Chart.

Release
The song was released as a 7" single and a 12" maxi single. The single version of "Only Love Remains" is a remix by Jim Boyer and is different from the album version. The 12" version of the single featured two more remixes of songs from Press to Play.

Cash Box said that "McCartney’s impeccable touch with a ballad shines on this classic-sounding new single."

Track listings 
7" single (R 6148)
 "Only Love Remains" – 4:11
 Remix by Jim Boyer
 "Tough on a Tightrope" – 4:44

12" single (12R 6148)
 "Only Love Remains" – 4:11
 Remix by Jim Boyer
 "Tough on a Tightrope" – 7:03
 Remix by Julian Mendelsohn
 "Talk More Talk" – 5:56
 Remix by Paul McCartney and Jon Jacobs

Charts

References

Paul McCartney songs
Songs written by Paul McCartney
Song recordings produced by Paul McCartney
Song recordings produced by Hugh Padgham
1986 singles
Rock ballads
1980s ballads
Music published by MPL Music Publishing